Elvifrance was a French comic book publisher, specializing in digest-sized publications, often translations from Italian fumetti.

Edited by Georges Bielec (October 21, 1936 – July 1993), it was founded in 1970  and owned by Giorgio Cavedon and Renzo Barbieri of Erregi. It ceased publication in 1992.

External links

List of Elvifrance Publications on the Grand Comics Database

Comic book publishing companies of France
Comic book digests
Publishing companies established in 1970
Publishing companies disestablished in 1992
French companies disestablished in 1992
French companies established in 1970